"Bbibbi" is a song recorded by South Korean singer-songwriter IU, released digitally on October 10, 2018, through Kakao M. The self-written song was produced by Son Myung-gab. It subsequently debuted at number one on the Gaon Digital Chart. The song was released in part to commemorate 10 years since IU's debut.

Background
On October 1, 2018, IU announced the single through promotional posters on various social media accounts. According to Kakao M, the song was created in part to commemorate ten years since IU debuted.

Composition
"Bbibbi" is a laid-back alt-R&B track with confrontational and introspective lyrics that addresses IU's haters and critics, with her turning around commentary on her image. Particular attention was paid to her delivery, including phrases and words like "yellow C-A-R-D" and "hello stu-P-I-D". "Bbibbi" refers to a pager in Korean, in particular the noise the device makes before people leave a message.

Commercial performance
"Bbibbi" debuted atop the Gaon Digital Chart on the week ending October 13, making it her twentieth number one song in South Korea–the most for any artist.

Music video
The music video, directed by VM Project, was released along with the song and makes prominent use of monochromatic colour schemes. IU performs a choreographed hip hop dance routine with a blank expression on her face, which was called "more cute than menacing" by Caitlin Kelley of Forbes. She also appears in high fashion looks, with Billboard stating that she wears a "Grace Kelly-style scarf".

The video currently has over 230 million views, making it the second most popular Korean music video by a female soloist in 2018.

Accolades

Charts

Certifications

See also
List of certified songs in South Korea
List of Gaon Digital Chart number ones of 2018
List of Inkigayo Chart winners (2018)
List of Kpop Hot 100 number ones

References

2018 songs
2018 singles
Gaon Digital Chart number-one singles
IU (singer) songs
Korean-language songs
Kakao M singles
Billboard Korea K-Pop number-one singles
Songs written by IU (singer)